C. W. Smith may refer to:
 C. W. Smith (writer), American writer and professor of English
 C. W. Smith (racing driver), American stock car racing driver
 C.W. Smith (engineer), American engineer and professor